Olivares may refer to:

Places 
 Olivares, Spain, a municipality in Seville province, Spain
 Olivares de Júcar, a municipality in Cuenca province, Spain
 Olivares de Duero, a municipality in Valladolid, province, Spain
 Olivares River, in Chile

People with the surname 
 House of Olivares, a Spanish noble house
 Pedro Pérez de Guzmán, 1st Count of Olivares
 Enrique de Guzmán, 2nd Count of Olivares (1540–1607)
 Gaspar de Guzmán, Count-Duke of Olivares (1587–1645), Spanish statesman
 Enrique Felipe de Guzmán, 2nd Count-Duke of Olivares
 Amanda Olivares (born 1966), Mexican beauty pageant winner
 Antonio de Olivares, (1630–1722), Spanish Franciscan
 Daniel Olivares (cyclist) (born 1940), a Filipino cyclist
 Daniel Olivares (politician) (born 1981), a Peruvian politician
 Ed Olivares (born 1938), Puerto Rican baseball player
 Edgar Olivares (born 1977), Bolivian footballer
 Edward Olivares (born 1996), Venezuelan baseball player
 Élodie Olivarès (born 1976), French athlete
 Gerardo Olivares (born 1964), Spanish filmmaker
 Iván Olivares (born 1961), Venezuelan basketball player
 José Olivares (born 1997), Dominican tennis player
 Juan Olivares (born 1941), Chilean footballer
 Juan Manuel Olivares (1760–1797), Venezuelan composer
 Julián de Olivares (1895–1977), Spanish fencer
 Laureano Olivares (born 1978), Venezuelan actor
 Manuel Olivares (1909–1976), Spanish football player and manager
 Maritza Olivares, Mexican actress
 Miguel de Olivares (1675–1768), Chilean Jesuit and historian
 Omar Olivares (born 1967), Puerto Rican baseball player
 Percy Olivares (born 1968), Peruvian footballer
 Raúl Olivares (born 1988), Chilean footballer
 Richard Olivares (born 1978), Chilean footballer
 Rodrigo Olivares (born 1976), Chilean swimmer
 Roger Olivares, Filipino author
 Rubén Olivares (born 1947), Mexican professional boxer